Peony Pavilion is a 2001 Hong Kong drama film directed by Yonfan. It was entered into the 23rd Moscow International Film Festival where Rie Miyazawa won the award for Best Actress.

Cast
 Joey Wang as Rong Lan
 Rie Miyazawa as Cui Hua
 Daniel Wu as Xing Zhi Gang
 Brigitte Lin as Narrator
 Yonfan as Dance tutor

References

External links
 

2001 films
2001 drama films
Hong Kong drama films
2000s Mandarin-language films
Films directed by Yonfan
Films about Chinese opera
Kunqu
2000s Hong Kong films
Hong Kong musical films